Jobe is a water sports brand and manufacturer of products used for wakeboarding, boating and standup paddleboarding. The Jobe headquarters and warehouse are located in Heerewaarden, Netherlands.

History 
The brand was created in 1974 by former professional skier Jeff Jobe. Jobe skis were shipped all over the world. In 2008 Sport and Recreation Den Bol bought the trademark licenses from Jobe, changed their name into Jobe Sports International and a new Jobe era started. Currently Jobe sells its products worldwide and manufactures products used for the boating, jet ski, cable wakeboarding and stand-up paddling scenes.

Sponsorship 
Jobe sponsors numerous water sports events throughout the year. Jobe also has a large team of sponsored athletes who represent the brand.

Cable wakeboarding team 
Julian Cohen			USA
Yonel Cohen			USA		
Dominik Gührs			GER	
Maxine Sapulette		NLD
Jon Dickey			USA
Marc Besner			CAN
Rocco van Straten		NLD
Efi Levi			ISL
Moti Levi			ISL
Declan Clifford		GBR
Omeir Saeed			UAE
Sam de Haan                    NLD
Ariano Blanik                  GER
Cor Piels.                     NLD

Boat wakeboarding team 
Austin Hair			USA
Taylor McCullough		USA
Marc Kroon			NLD
Paul Johnston			IRE

Skiing team 
Joshua Briant			AUS

PWC team 
Jennifer Menard		FRA
Axel Courtois			FRA
Brad Rickaby			GBR
Jonathan Kavanagh		GBR
Antoine Goethals		BEL

Kiteboarding team 
Steven Akkersdijk		NLD
Dylan van der Meij		NLD
Jop Heemskerk			NLD

References

Sports equipment
Manufacturing companies established in 1974
1974 establishments in the Netherlands